The following list of disasters in Estonia is a list of major disasters (excluding conventional acts of war but including acts of terrorism) which relate to Estonia or involved its citizens, in a definable incident or accident such as a shipwreck, where the loss of life was five or more, while some traffic accidents with under ten victims may be excluded.

Disasters by death toll

Other significant disasters

See also
 List of accidents and disasters by death toll (worldwide)
 List of wars involving Estonia

References

Estonia
Death in Estonia
Disasters
Estonia